Stanley Palmer Richard (born October 21, 1967 in Mineola, Texas) also known as the "Sheriff," is a retired American football safety in the National Football League. Richard played football at Hawkins High School in Hawkins, Texas, where he was selected as an all-state player.
Richard played at the University of Texas from 1987–90, where he was an All-American safety in 1990. He was drafted 9th overall by the San Diego Chargers in the 1991 NFL Draft and played with the Chargers from 1991-94. He was signed by the Washington Redskins as an unrestricted free agent on March 10, 1995 and played with the Redskins from 1995-98.  He retired following the 1998 season. He had 21 career interceptions returned for 352 yards and two touchdowns.  Richard currently resides in Hawkins, Texas.

See also
List of Texas Longhorns football All-Americans
List of Los Angeles Chargers first-round draft picks

References

1967 births
Living people
People from Mineola, Texas
American football safeties
Texas Longhorns football players
San Diego Chargers players
Washington Redskins players